Laki is a small town in Laki Municipality in Plovdiv Province, southern Bulgaria. As of 2006 it has 2,615 inhabitants. It is located in the Rhodope mountains, 54 km to the south of the province capital Plovdiv, and 88 km to the north of Smolyan. There is a lead-zinc flotation factory, several textile plants and timber workshops.

Towns in Bulgaria
Cities and towns in the Rhodopes
Populated places in Plovdiv Province